Treasure Coast International Airport  is a public airport located three miles (5 km) northwest of the central business district of Fort Pierce, a city in St. Lucie County, Florida, United States. It is owned by the St. Lucie Board of County Commissioners.

The airport sees frequent use by various aviation flight schools in south Florida, including three based at the airport, for general aviation flight training traffic.  The airport also hosts a Federal Inspection Station (FIS) administered by United States Customs & Border Protection, which makes it a frequent stop for private aircraft coming in and out of the Bahama Islands.

DayJet provided an on-demand jet air taxi service from this airport before suspending operation in September 2008.

History

The history of the airport dates back to 1921, when the Commercial Club of Fort Pierce built an airport where the local American Legion building now stands on U.S. Route 1 for an airline that never got off the ground.  Nine years later, the county purchased  of land that eventually became the current airport; however, the first commercial airport was dedicated in 1935 in an area in the vicinity of U.S. Route 1 and Edwards Road.

The current airport, originally named Fort Pierce Airport, was leased during World War II by the U.S. Navy as an auxiliary field for pilots and flight crews from Naval Air Station Vero Beach, Naval Air Station Melbourne and Naval Air Station Fort Lauderdale for conducting daytime and nighttime field carrier landing practice (FCLP) prior to landing on actual aircraft carriers. Scout aircraft, dive bombers and torpedo attack bombers used the runways, which were redesigned by the military to better accommodate naval aviation training requirements. In 1947, the Navy disestablished operations and the U.S. Government conveyed the airport back to the county, to include two newly constructed runways, without charging for the improvements made.

With little financial capital in county government to operate and maintain a modern airport, the facility languished for the next ten years, becoming overgrown with vegetation and subject to frequent grazing by cattle from nearby farms and ranches.  During the 1960s and 1970s, major improvements took off with the construction of an airport terminal, modern hangars, airfield lighting, navigational aids and fuel facilities. Curtis King, who became the first full-time director in 1967, played an instrumental role in the development of the county's airport for 31 years.

The airport continued to evolve as a general aviation facility, and even though two of four runways were decommissioned, one such former runway became the site of the Airport West Commerce Park, while Runway 9R/27L (later renamed 10R/28L) was lengthened and improved.

Runway 10L/28R was completed in early 2010, costing $15.3 million. The recent completion of a north–south connector taxiway between training runway 10L/28R and runway 10R/28L reduced the need for training aircraft to use one of the primary runways for takeoffs and landings at the beginning and/or end of training flights, respectively.

Facilities and aircraft 

For the 12-month period ending January 2, 2018, the airport had 196,000 general aviation aircraft operations, an average of 537 per day. There were at that time 207 aircraft based at this airport: 145 single-engine, 39 multi-engine, 7 jet, 15 helicopter and 1 glider. At that time 53% of movements were local general aviation and 47% were transient general aviation.

Accidents and incidents
On 5 November 2009, Grumman Albatross N120FB of Albatross Adventures crashed when an engine failed shortly after take-off. The aircraft was damaged beyond economic repair.
On 4 April 2012, a twin Cessna made a gear-up landing, after a landing gear failure. The aircraft came to rest on runway 32 and was lifted off by a crane later the same day.

References

External links 
 Treasure Coast International Airport page at county website
   brochure from CFASPP (March 2007)
  article referencing recent name change
 
 

County airports in the United States
Airports in Florida
Transportation buildings and structures in St. Lucie County, Florida
Treasure Coast